Pampa (from the Quechua: pampa, meaning "plain") is a city in Gray County, Texas, United States. Its population was 16,867 as of the 2020 census. Pampa is the county seat of Gray County and is the principal city of the Pampa micropolitan statistical area, which includes both Gray and Roberts Counties. Pampa is named after the Pampas Lowlands in Argentina, Uruguay, and southern Brazil.

Pampa hosts the Top o' Texas Rodeo each year in July, which brings competitors from Texas and the surrounding states to Gray County. The White Deer Land Company Museum, which showcases ranching exhibits, is located in downtown Pampa.

History
In 1888, the Santa Fe Railroad was constructed through the area where Pampa would be established. A rail station and telegraph office were built, and the townsite was laid out by George Tyng, manager of the White Deer Lands ranch. The town was first called "Glasgow", then "Sutton", and then the name was changed to "Pampa" after the pampas grasslands of South America at Mr. Tyng's suggestion. Timothy Dwight Hobart, a native of Vermont, sold plots of land for the town only to people who agreed to settle there and develop the land, and Pampa soon became a center for agriculture. Gas and oil were discovered in the Texas Panhandle in 1916. Pampa prospered greatly in the resulting oil boom, and the Gray County seat of government was moved in 1928 from Lefors to Pampa.

The Army Air Forces Training Command operated the Pampa Army Air Field that was in operation from 1942 to 1945. The former base is located near the intersection of SH 152 and FM 1474, about 10 miles east of the town.

1995 tornado

On June 8, 1995, a violent tornado hit the industrial section on the west side of Pampa, destroying or damaging about 250 businesses and homes. It resulted in $30 million in damage and was the costliest and the most destructive tornado on record for this town. It had a 3-mile-long path and was 200 yards wide. At its peak, it was rated an F4 on the Fujita scale.

Geography
Pampa is located in northwestern Gray County.

U.S. Route 60 passes through Pampa, leading northeast  to Canadian and southwest  to Amarillo. Texas State Highway 70 crosses US 60 in the southwest part of Pampa and leads north  to Perryton and south  to Interstate 40.

Demographics

2020 census

As of the 2020 United States census, there were 16,867 people, 6,601 households, and 4,234 families residing in the city.

2010 Census
As of the census of 2010, 17,994 people resided in Pampa, a 0.6% increase from 2000. The population density was 2,008.3 people per square mile (775.6/km).  The racial makeup of the city was 80.9% White, 3.3% Black, 0.8% American Indian or Alaskan Native, 0.4% Asian, had 2.6% reporting two or more races. Hispanics or Latinos of any race were 26% of the population.

The 7,123 households (2006–2010) averaged 2.6 persons per household. Persons under 18 years of age accounted for 27%, and under 5 years of age accounted for 8.1% of the population. Persons over age 65 accounted for 16% of the population.

The median household income was $40,358, with the per capita income in the past 12 months (2010 dollars) 2006–2010 being $22,025. The home ownership rate (2006–2010) was 76.2%, with the median value of owner-occupied housing units was $65,300.

2000 Census
As of the census of 2000, 17,887 people, 7,387 households, and 5,074 families were residing in the city. The population density was 2,050.0 people per square mile (791.1/km). The 8,785 housing units averaged 1,006.8 per mi2 (388.5/km). The racial makeup of the city was 83.69% White, 3.85% African American, 1.07% Native American, 0.41% Asian, 8.25% from other races, and 2.73% from two or more races. Hispanics or Latinos of any race were 13.72% of the population.

Of the 7,387 households, 30.4% had children under the age of 18 living with them, 55.9% were married couples living together, 9.8% had a female householder with no husband present, and 31.3% were not families. About 28.8% of all households were made up of individuals, and 15.3% had someone living alone who was 65 years of age or older. The average household size was 2.39, and the average family size was 2.94.

In the city, the age distribution was 25.9% under the age of 18, 7.4% from 18 to 24, 25.4% from 25 to 44, 22.6% from 45 to 64, and 18.7% who were 65 years of age or older. The median age was 39 years. For every 100 females, there were 91.0 males. For every 100 females age 18 and over, there were 86.8 males.

The median income for a household in the city was $31,213, and for a family was $39,810. Males had a median income of $32,717 versus $20,492 for females. The per capita income for the city was $17,791. About 12.1% of families and 14.8% of the population were below the poverty line, including 19.7% of those under age 18 and 9.4% of those age 65 or over.

Media
The Pampa News, a daily newspaper published in Pampa, serves Pampa and the surrounding areas of Gray County. The paper is published daily except Sundays, Mondays, and major holidays. Its daily circulation is about 3,600.

Pampa is served by four commercial radio stations. KGRO 1230 AM, KOMX 100.3 FM, and KDRL 103.3 FM serve the Panhandle region with local news. KGRO went on the air in 1966, and has been the longtime home of Pampa Harvester sports. The stations are owned by Pampa Broadcasters Inc.

KHNZ 101.3 FM is a classic country station owned by Route 66 Media of Shamrock.

Education
The city is served by the Pampa Independent School District. The school district administers four elementary schools (Austin, Lamar, Travis, and Wilson) and one junior high school. Pampa High School and the nontraditional Pampa Learning Center are also part of the school system.

Pampa is also served by the Pampa Center branch of Clarendon College.

Library
The Lovett Memorial Library was built on the entire west half of the 100 block of North Houston Street. The building was dedicated on January 18, 1955. In 1985, the Harrington Foundation of Amarillo paid for the computerization of library records, joining the library for the first time into a consortium with most of the public libraries in the Panhandle. By the mid-1990s, Lovett Library was showing its age, and not compliant with the Americans for Disabilities Act. In October 1995, it was announced that Mrs. Ruth Ann Holland has left $500,000 to the Library Foundation in her will.

In 1996, the Lovett Library Foundation, which managed the Holland bequest and several other substantial bequests, announced that a plan was being made to extensive renovate the old building. In January 1998, the library staff, along with all books and much equipment, moved from the Houston Street facility to the old B. M. Baker school on the south side, where the library was set up in the cafeteria and classroom annex in the south part of the school complex.

This freed the old building on Houston Street for renovation. The children's area was moved to the second floor; a bridge was built between the second floor facility and other children's rooms in the south part of the building; an elevator was installed; new shelves, lighting, and ceiling tiles were installed; and the building was made completely ADA compliant.

In June 2003, it was announced that R. L. Franklin, prominent rancher of Pampa, would donate two statues to the library to honor the 50th anniversary of the opening of the building in January 1955. One statue, by Don Ray of Channing, represents a seated woman reading to a child; this is erected in front of the library. Another statue representing a Pioneer Woman was by David Frech of New York was placed in the library's Reading Garden. Both statues were dedicated to four local women, including the donor's mother, each of whom had a long involvement with the library. The statues were dedicated on January 9, 2005, and at one of the dedicatory events, author Elmer Kelton was the guest speaker.

Climate

Notable people

 Black Bart, retired professional wrestler
 Cody Canada, American southern rock/alt-country artist
 Mary Castle (1931–1998), actress
 Phil Cates (1947–2014), former state representative for House District 66
 Duane Lee Chapman, or Dog the Bounty Hunter, was raised in Pampa
 Warren Chisum, politician
 Gene Cockrell, American football player
 Gerald J. Ford, most recently the Chairman of the Trustees of Southern Methodist University in Dallas
Ben H. Guill (1909–1994), Republican U.S. representative from Texas's 18th congressional district from 1950 to 1951
 Woody Guthrie, the songwriter, moved to Pampa with his father Charles Guthrie and attended high school there briefly
 John Jenkins, former University of Houston head football coach
 Randy Matson, a former World Champion shot putter
 Tom Mechler, state chairman of the Republican Party of Texas from 2015 to 2017
 T. Boone Pickens, chairman of the private equity firm BP Capital Management, and former CEO of Mesa Petroleum
 Trae Young, basketball player (point guard)
 Zach Thomas, retired National Football League linebacker

References

External links

 City of Pampa official website
 Pampa in the Handbook of Texas
 The Pampa News
 First Baptist Church

Cities in Gray County, Texas
Cities in Texas
Pampa, Texas micropolitan area
County seats in Texas